María Pérez, called La Balteira ("the Balteira"), was a Galician trobairitz and soldadeira.

Life 
María Pérez was a composer and singer who wrote sacred plainsong, performed in the courts of Europe, and was somewhat of an adventurer.

She was popular at the courts of Ferdinand III of Castile and Alfonso X of Castile, and the latter dedicated a song to her.

References

Citations

Bibliography 

 Abelleira, Fernando Magán (1996). Lírica profana galego-potuguesa. Vol. 1. Galicia: Centro Ramón Piñeiro. pp. 39, 149, 421.
 Abelleira, Fernando Magán (2007). "María Pérez, Balteira, ou, María Balteira na literatura medieval. Escolma de textos". Consello da Cultura Galega, Comisión de Igualdade. pp. 1–13.
 Alvar, Carlos (1985). "María Pérez, Balteira". Aragonese Philology Archive, no. 36. pp. 11–40.
 Amil, Iván Fernández (22 November 2020). "María Pérez la Balteira, la gallega que conquistó Jerusalén y la Corte de Alfonso X". Quincemil, El Español. Retrieved 20 April 2022.
 Campo, Marica (2007). "María Balteira". Álbum de mulleres. Consello da Cultura Galega. Retrieved 19 April 2022.
 Commire, Anne, ed. (2001). Women in World History: A Biographical Encyclopedia. Vol. 12: O–Q. Waterford, CT: Yorkin Publications, Gale Group. .
 Commire, Anne, ed. (2007). "Perez, Maria". In Dictionary of Women Worldwide: 25,000 Women through the Ages. Vol. 2: M–Z. Farmington Hills, MI: Thomson Gale. p. 1,498.
 Díaz, Esther Corral (2016). "Maria Balteira, a Woman Crusader of Outremer". In Gonzáles-Paz, Carlos Andrés (ed.). Women and Pilgrimage in Medieval Galicia. Routledge: New York: pp. 65–80. 
 Lopes, Maria da Graça Videira (1994). A Sátira nos cancioneiros medievais galego-portugueses. Lisbon: Imprensa universitária, editorial estampa. pp. 221–225. .
 Ventura, Joaquim (September 2017). "O contrato de de María Pérez Balteira con Sobrado". Grial: revista galega de cultura, vol. LV, no. 215. pp. 134–141.
 Ruiz, Joaquim Ventura (2015). "A verdadeira cruzada de María Pérez «Balteira»". In Alvar, Carlos (ed.). Estudios de literatura medieval en la Península Ibérica. San Millán de la Cogolla: Cilengua. pp. 1,167–1,182.

External links 

 Canfranc, Pablo Rodríguez (18 April 2022). "Manseliña y las cantigas de escarnio sobre la soldadeira María Pérez Balteira". MusicaAntigua. Retrieved 19 April 2022.
 Canfranc, Pablo Rodríguez (23 June 2014). "María Pérez Balteira, la soldadera de los trovadores". MusicaAntigua. Retrieved 19 April 2022.
 Solano, Alberto (5 January 2022). "47- María Perez "la Balteira"". Tradición Jacobea. Retrieved 19 April 2022.
 "María Balteira: famosa e descoñecida, criticada e admirada". Agrupación Cultural Alexandre Bóveda. (27 June 2019). Retrieved 19 April 2022.
 "María Pérez, la Balteira, soldadera de fama en la corte de Alfonso X el Sabio". El Mundo entre nosotras. (10 September 2020). Retrieved 19 April 2022.
 "Perez, Maria (fl. 13th c.)". Encyclopedia.com. (n.d.). Retrieved 19 April 2022. 

Trobairitz
13th-century Galician people
13th-century Spanish women